Luigi Petrali (1815 - 1855) was an Italian composer. He was a student of Saverio Mercadante. His opera Sofonisba premiered at La Scala on 6 February 1844. On 23 February 1854 his opera Ginevra di Scozia premiered at the Teatro Sociale di Mantova.

References

1815 births
1855 deaths
Italian classical composers
Italian male classical composers
Italian opera composers
Male opera composers
19th-century classical composers
19th-century Italian composers
19th-century Italian male musicians